{{DISPLAYTITLE:C21H20O9}}
The molecular formula C21H20O9 (molar mass: 416.38 g/mol, exact mass: 416.1107 u) may refer to:

 Aleuritin, a coumarinolignoid
 Daidzin, an isoflavone
 Puerarin, an isoflavone

Molecular formulas